This is a list of universities in Guatemala.

Public institution
Universidad de San Carlos de Guatemala, founded in 1676

Private institutions
Universidad Rafael Landívar, founded in 1961
Universidad del Valle de Guatemala, founded in 1966
Universidad Mariano Gálvez de Guatemala, founded in 1966
Universidad Francisco Marroquín, founded in 1971
Universidad Rural de Guatemala, founded in 1995
Universidad del Istmo, founded in 1997
Universidad Panamericana, founded in 1998
Universidad Mesoamericana, founded in 1999
Universidad Galileo, founded in 2000
Universidad San Pablo de Guatemala, founded in 2006
Universidad InterNaciones, founded in 2009
Universidad de Occidente, founded in 2010
Universidad Da Vinci de Guatemala, founded in 2012
Universidad Regional de Guatemala, founded in 2014

Other institutions
Academia de Artes Culinarias de Guatemala
Instituto Femenino de Estudios Superiores IFES
INTECAP - Instituto de Capacitacion 
Loyola Escuela Empresarial para las Américas
National Conservatory of Music Germán Alcántara

Universities
Universities
Universities
Guatemala
Guatemala